Merced County Times is a weekly newspaper serving Merced County in California, USA. Founded in 1964, the Times has a circulation of 5,600 and is published every Thursday.

History
Merced County Times was founded in 1964 by John M. Derby on his kitchen table with only a camera and a Remington noiseless typewriter.

Ownership
Merced County Times is owned by Mid Valley Publications, an employee owned company

Online edition
The Merced County Times also publishes news online.

References

External links
Merced County Times official website

Weekly newspapers published in California
Merced, California
Mass media in Merced County, California
Publications established in 1964
1964 establishments in California
Merced County Times